Novaki is the name of several villages. It may refer to

In Croatia 
 Novaki, Sveta Nedelja, near Sveta Nedelja, Zagreb County
 , near Dubrava, Zagreb County
 , near Sopje
 Novaki, Varaždin County, near Maruševec
 Novaki Bistranski, near Bistra, Zagreb County 
 , near Bizovac, Osijek-Baranja County
 , near Ozalj, Karlovac County
 Novaki Petrovinski, near Jastrebarsko, Zagreb County
 , near Križevci, Koprivnica-Križevci County
 Novaki Šćitarjevski, near Velika Gorica, Zagreb County
 Kraljevečki Novaki, part of the Sesvete district of the City of Zagreb

In Slovenia 
 Dolenji Novaki, near Cerkno
 Gorenji Novaki, near Cerkno